This list of the Pamantasan ng Lungsod ng Maynila faculty includes current and former instructors and administrators of Pamantasan ng Lungsod ng Maynila, a leading public university located in Intramuros, Manila, the Philippines.

The University employs full-time and part-time instructors and professors. Part-time faculty members are recruited from the ranks of executives in the government service, as well as practitioners and leaders of private industries. A master's degree is required as part of minimum requirements for permanency.

Footnotes

External links
 PLM official website
 PLM College of Engineering and Technology Official website
 Association of South East Asian Institutes of Learning

Pamantasan ng Lungsod ng Maynila
Pamantasan